Wainlode Cliff is a 1.3 hectare geological Site of Special Scientific Interest in Gloucestershire, notified in 1954.  It overlooks Hasfield Ham.

Geology
This an historic locality which was first described in 1842 and shows a seven-metre section of Rhaetian age. The site mains the regional two-fold division of Westbury and Cotham Beds.  The Insect Limestone, which is a productive source of insects, defines the base of the Lias.

Fishing
Seasonal fishing is permitted on the riverbank beneath the cliff.  Day tickets are available from the campsite shop, currently priced at £5 per day (2022).

Sources
 Natural England SSSI information on citation, map and unit details 
 Natural England SSSI information on the Wainlode Cliff unit

References

External links
 English Nature (SSSI information)

Sites of Special Scientific Interest in Gloucestershire
Sites of Special Scientific Interest notified in 1954